Anthia alternata is a species of ground beetle in the subfamily Anthiinae. It was described by Henry Walter Bates in 1978.

References

Anthiinae (beetle)
Beetles described in 1978